Voltage      
is the term for the difference in potential energy. It may also refer to:

Companies 
 Voltage (company), a Japanese app developer
 Voltage Pictures, a film financing, production, and distribution company

Electronics and electrical engineering 
 Voltage controller, a device that converts a fixed voltage to variable
 Voltage converter, a type of electric power converter
 Voltage drop, how electrical energy is reduced as it moves through a circuit
 Voltage droop, a loss in voltage from a device as it drives a load
 Voltage doubler, a circuit that outputs twice the voltage as input
 Voltage divider, a circuit that outputs a voltage that is a fraction of its input
 Voltage ladder, a circuit useful for providing a set of successive voltage references
 Voltage portal, a device that extends a voltage source to the outside of an enclosure
 Voltage reduction, the reduction in the voltage across a resistance circuit
 Voltage reference, an electronic device that produces a constant voltage
 Voltage regulation, the measure of the change in voltage in a component
 Voltage regulator, a device designed to maintain a constant voltage
 Voltage sag, a short duration reduction in voltage
 Voltage source, the dual of a current source
 Voltage spike, a sudden changes in voltage
 Voltage-controlled amplifier (VCA), a type of electronic amplifier
 Voltage-controlled filter (VCF), a type of electronic filter
 Voltage-controlled oscillator (VCO), a type of electronic oscillator
 Voltage-sensitive relay (VSR), a type of relay

Mathematics 
 Voltage graph, a type of directed graph in graph-theoretic mathematics

Music 
 Voltage, a rockband from the Netherlands

People 
 Sarine Voltage (born 1959), American musician

Places 
 Voltage, Oregon, an unincorporated community in Harney County, Oregon, United States

See also
 Volt (disambiguation)
 Ampere (disambiguation)